Endoclita yunnanensis is a species of moth from the family Hepialidae. It is found in Yunnan, China.

References

External links
Hepialidae genera

Moths described in 1985
Hepialidae